The Shawnee Correctional Center  is a medium-security state prison for men located in Vienna, Johnson County, Illinois, owned and operated by the Illinois Department of Corrections.

The facility was first opened in 1984, and has a working capacity of 2147.  The facility is adjacent to the state's Vienna Correctional Center.

Notable inmates
 Tesfaye Cooper - perpetrator of the 2017 Chicago torture incident hate crime

References

Prisons in Illinois
Buildings and structures in Johnson County, Illinois
1984 establishments in Illinois